Naomy Grand'Pierre (born 16 April 1997) is a Haitian-American swimmer. She competed in the women's 50 metre freestyle event at the 2016 Summer Olympics, where she ranked 56th with a time of 27.46 seconds. Grand'Pierre is the first woman from Haiti to compete as a swimmer in the Olympics.

Born in Montreal and raised in Atlanta, Georgia, Grand'Pierre is a dual US-Haitian citizen. She is a graduate of Whitefield Academy (Georgia) and the University of Chicago (Class of 2019)  and collaborated with the USA Swimming Diversity and Inclusion Committee during her college years. She is currently helping the  Haitian National Swim Team, in collaboration with the FHSA (Haitian Swimming Federation), structure their program to give Haitians in Haiti and the Diaspora more access to the sport.

Records

Personal life
Her mother encouraged all five of her children to swim after three relatives drowned. She is the older sister of Emilie Grand'Pierre, another Haitian swimmer who competed at the Tokyo Olympics 2020.

References

External links
 Naomy Grand'Pierre website
 

Grand'Pierre
Grand'Pierre
Grand'Pierre
Grand'Pierre
Grand'Pierre
Grand'Pierre
Competitors at the 2018 Central American and Caribbean Games
Grand'Pierre
Grand'Pierre
Grand'Pierre
Black Canadian sportswomen
Grand'Pierre
Grand'Pierre
20th-century Haitian people
21st-century American women